Robert Travers  was  Bishop of Leighlin  from 1550 to 1555 when Queen Mary deposed him for being a married man.

References

16th-century Anglican bishops in Ireland
Bishops of Leighlin